Robert Hamnett (1889 – 1967) was an English footballer who played for Stoke.

Career
Hamnett was born in Manchester and began his career playing for Fenton in Stoke-upon-Trent. He joined Stoke for the 1913–14 season playing five times and scoring twice both coming in a 2–1 win away at Welsh side Mardy.

Career statistics

References

English footballers
Stoke City F.C. players
1889 births
1967 deaths
Association football forwards